Ferencvárosi Torna Club is a Hungarian women's handball team from Budapest, that is part of the multi-sports club Ferencvárosi TC. Nicknamed Fradi, the team plays in the Nemzeti Bajnokság I, the top level championship in Hungary. They are one of the most successful clubs in the country, having won eleven Hungarian championships and as many Hungarian cup titles. FTC also enjoy a good reputation in continental competitions: they lifted the EHF Cup Winners' Cup trophy in 1978, 2011, and 2012, and they were also crowned as the EHF Cup winners in 2006. The team also reached the finals of the EHF Champions League two times, however, they fell short in both occasions.

The current name of the club is FTC-Rail Cargo Hungaria due to sponsorship reasons.

Crest, colours, supporters

Kit manufacturers and Shirt sponsor
The following table shows in detail Ferencvárosi TC kit manufacturers and shirt sponsors by year:

Kits

Sports Hall information

Name: – Elek Gyula Aréna
City: – Budapest, IX. ker
Capacity: – 1300
Address: – 1101 Budapest, Kőbányai út 47./A

Team

Current squad
Squad for the 2022–23 season

Goalkeepers
 1  Kincső Sass
 13  Kinga Janurik
 16  Blanka Bíró

Left Wingers 
 15  Júlia Hársfalvi
 21  Gréta Márton
 94  Bodza Buzsáki

Right Wingers
 18  Anett Kovács 
 24  Dorka Papp
 26  Angela Malestein

Line players 
 3  Béatrice Edwige 
 14  Anett Kisfaludy
 72  Dragana Cvijić

Left backs
 20  Emily Bölk
 23  Zsuzsanna Tomori
 50  Luca Kármán 
 90  Szandra Szöllősi-Zácsik

Centre backs
 8  Zita Szucsánszki
 27  Anna Kukely 
 77  Andrea Lekić
 91  Anikó Cirjenics-Kovacsics (c)

Right backs
 17  Alicia Stolle
 42  Katrin Klujber

Transfers
Transfers for the 2023–24 season

 Joining

 Leaving
 Zita Szucsánszki (CB) (retires)
 Alicia Stolle (RB) (to  Borussia Dortmund)

Staff members
  Head Coach: Gábor Elek
  Assistant Coach: Attila Kovács
  Goalkeeping Coach: Norbert Duleba
  Fitness Coach: Máté Ungvári
  Club Doctor: Attila Pavlik, MD
  Physiotherapist: Dorottya Vajay-Gazsó

Honours

Domestic competitions
Nemzeti Bajnokság I (National Championship of Hungary)
 Champions (13): 1966, 1968, 1969, 1971, 1993–94, 1994–95, 1995–96, 1996–97, 1999–00, 2001–02, 2006–07, 2014–15, 2020–21
 Runners-up (21): 1963, 1967, 1970, 1972, 1973, 1976, 1977, 1978, 1992–93, 1998–99, 2000–01, 2002–03, 2005–06, 2008–09, 2011–12, 2012–13, 2013–14, 2015–16, 2016–17, 2017–18, 2018–19
 Third place (10): 1974, 1975, 1979, 1980, 1987, 1997–98, 2003–04, 2004–05, 2007–08, 2010–11

Magyar Kupa (National Cup of Hungary)
 Winners (13): 1967, 1970, 1972, 1977, 1992–93, 1993–94, 1994–95, 1995–96, 1996–97, 2000–01, 2002–03, 2016–17, 2021-22
 Finalist (11): 1963, 1973, 1978, 1986, 1997–98, 1998–99, 2006–07, 2009–10, 2012–13, 2013–14, 2014–15

European competitions
EHF Champions League:
Runners-up (2): 1970–71, 2001–02
Semifinalists: 1996, 1997, 2001

EHF Cup Winners' Cup:
Winners (3) – record: 1977–78, 2010–11, 2011–12
Runners-up (2): 1978–79, 1993–94
Semifinalists: 2007, 2015

EHF Cup:
Winners (1): 2005–06
Semifinalists: 2004–05

EHF Champions Trophy:
Third Placed: 2002
Fourth Placed: 2006

Other tournaments
Baia Mare Champions Trophy:
Second Placed: 2014

Recent seasons

Seasons in Nemzeti Bajnokság I: 64

In European competition

Participations in Champions League (Champions Cup): 27x
Participations in EHF Cup: 4x
Participations in Cup Winners' Cup (IHF Cup Winners' Cup): 9x

Top scorers in the EHF Champions League 
(All-Time) – Last updated on 18 March 2023

Individual awards in the EHF Champions League
Last updated on 4 September 2022

Notable players 

  Valéria Agócs
  Barbara Balogh
  Mária Bende
  Klára Csiszár-Szekeres
  Rita Deli
  Mária Dévényi
  Dorottya Faluvégi
  Ágnes Farkas
  Andrea Farkas
  Márta Giba
  Noémi Háfra
  Gabriella Juhász
  Olívia Kamper
  Fanni Kenyeres
  Erika Kirsner
  Mónika Kovacsicz
  Beatrix Kökény
  Rozália Lelkes 
  Dóra Lőwy
  Viktória Lukács
  Melinda Pastrovics
  Ildikó Pádár
  Anna Rothermel
  Eszter Siti 
  Nadine Schatzl
  Viktória Soós
  Amália Sterbinszky
  Tímea Sugár
  Piroska Szamoránsky
  Luca Szekerczés
  Melinda Szikora
  Beatrix Tóth
  Ildikó Tóth
  Tímea Tóth
  Orsolya Vérten
  Katerina Harisová
  Katarina Mravíková
  Lucia Uhraková
  Katarina Miklosová
  Marija Jovanović
  Bobana Klikovac
  Djurdjina Malović
  Jelena Lavko
  Katarina Tomašević
  Danick Snelder
  Laura van der Heijden
  Laura Steinbach
  Julia Behnke
  Nerea Pena
  Elena Abramovich
  Emilie Christensen

Former coaches 
  Endre Balogh 
  Gyula Elek  Longest serving coach in Ferencvárosi TC's history
  Gyula Elek and András Németh 
  Károly Konkoly 
  Mária Berzsényi 
  Pál Hoffmann 
  András Németh  Most honours won with Ferencvárosi TC
  Gyula Zsiga 
  Gábor Elek  Son of former coach Gyula Elek.

Ferencvárosi TC II
Ferencvárosi TC II is the junior team of Ferencvárosi TC women's handball club. They compete in the Nemzeti Bajnokság I/B, the second-tier league in Hungary. Although they play in the same league system as their senior team, rather than a separate league, they are ineligible for promotion to the Nemzeti Bajnokság I, since junior teams cannot play in the same division as their senior side.

References

External links
 Ferencvárosi TC Official Website 
 Club page on the European Handball Federation website

 
Handball clubs established in 1950
Sport in Budapest